Wilopo (21 October 1909 – 1 June 1981) was an Indonesian politician and lawyer. A capable administrator, he served as prime minister of Indonesia from 1952 to 1953. He also held various other positions during his career, including as Minister of Labor, Minister of Economic Affairs, speaker of the Constitutional Assembly, and chairman of the Supreme Advisory Council.

Born into a Muslim family in Purworejo, Wilopo attended the Rechts Hogeschool in Batavia (now Jakarta), during which time he became involved in educational and nationalist groups. After graduating, he worked as a lawyer and was active in the Indonesian nationalist movement, becoming involved in the Partindo and Gerindo political parties. During the Japanese occupation period (1942–1945), Wilopo became an official in the occupation government and was a figure in both the Putera and Suishintai organizations. Following the proclamation of Indonesian Independence in 1945, Wilopo joined the newly formed Republican government, first as an aide to Jakarta Mayor Suwiryo, then as a member of the Central Indonesian National Committee. During the Indonesian National Revolution (1945–1949), he joined the Indonesian National Party (PNI) and became Junior Minister of Labor in 1947.

Following the recognition of sovereignty in the Dutch–Indonesian Round Table Conference, in which he took part, Wilopo was appointed Minister of Labor by Prime Minister Mohammad Hatta in 1949. He also emerged as a leader in the Indonesian National Party (PNI) and became Minister of Economic Affairs in the Soekiman Cabinet. In 1952, following a foreign policy debacle, the Soekiman Cabinet fell and Wilopo was appointed formateur of a new cabinet by President Sukarno. He opted to form a new cabinet consisting of pro-Western technocrats with unity, a common policy orientation, and the support of the PNI and Masyumi Party, even though both parties were unenthusiastic partners.

As prime minister, Wilopo presided over a realignment of political forces as the PNI grew increasingly wary of the Masyumi, the Nahdlatul Ulama split off from the Masyumi, and the Communist Party (PKI) re-entered the political scene. His premiership was also marked by a succession of crises, including an economic crisis and a show of force by the Indonesian Army, who opposed his cabinet's demobilization scheme, culminating in the downfall of his cabinet over a land dispute in North Sumatra. Afterwards, Wilopo continued to serve in public office, serving as speaker of the Constitutional Assembly (1956–1959) and chairman of the Supreme Advisory Council (1968–1978). He died in Jakarta in 1981.

Early life and education

Early life 
Wilopo was born in Purworejo, on October 21, 1909. He was born to modest family in Central Java. His father was man named Soedjono Soerodirjo, but he was raised by his uncle, a man known as Mantri Guru Prawirodiharjo. He wouldn't know of his real father until he reached adulthood. When he was eight years old, he and his family had to move to Loano which is five kilometers from Purworejo. They returned to Purworejo when he was in sixth grade.

Education 
Wilopo attended the Holland Inlandse School (HIS). He could have continued education at the Europese Hogere School (ELS), but he didn't  because he wanted to continue his education at the Opleiding School Voor Inlandsche Ambtenaren (OSVIA). After graduating from HIS, Wilopo continued his education to the Meer Uitgebreid Lager Onderwijs (MULO) in Magelang.

After studying at MULO, Wilopo continued his education at Algemene Middelbare School (AMS), in Yogyakarta. At AMS, Wilopo took part in exact sciences and physics. He received a scholarship to make ends meet during his life in Yogyakarta. During his saty in Yogyakarta, he enjoyed reading  newsletters of the De Locomotief, Darmo Kondo and Soeara Oemoem newspapers. Through this, he found the name of Sukarno (future President of Indonesia). Wilopo also joined the Jong Java youth organization around this time.

He continued his education at the Technischeh Hoge School (THS) in Bandung. There, Wilopo lived in the Prawirosentiko family's house. After some illnesses, he moved to Sukabumi, living in his cousin's house. There, he became a teacher at the Taman Siswa.

He moved to Jakarta and continued his studies at the Rechts Hoge School (RHS). During this time, he lived at the house of Abdul Rasyid, a friend of his from MULO.

Political career

Minister of Labour 
Wilopo's first government position was as the Junior Minister of Labour during the First and Second Amir Sjarifuddin Cabinets from 3 July 1947 to 29 January 1948. After a brief hiatus, he became the Minister of Labour during the Republic of the United States of Indonesia Cabinet from 20 December 1949 to 6 September 1950; he was later the Minister of Trade and Industry during the Sukiman Cabinet.

Prime Minister of Indonesia 
After completing his tenure as Minister of Trade and Industry, on 19 March 1952, Wilopo was told to choose a cabinet to lead. Three days after giving his list to President Sukarno, on 1 April he and his cabinet took power; it was essentially a coalition of necessity between the Masyumi and National parties. During his time as prime minister he also spent 26 days as Foreign Minister, from 3 to 29 April, making him the shortest serving Indonesian foreign minister as of 2011. As prime minister, he was initially able to draw support from the army by unhesitatingly accepting Sultan of Yogyakarta Hamengkubuwono IX as defence minister. After fourteen months, the cabinet collapsed; the collapse was blamed on land issues.

Post-prime ministership 
From 1955 to 1959, Wilopo served as the Speaker of the Constitutional Assembly of Indonesia. He later became head of the Commission of Four, a part of the Corruption Eradication Team, with his service beginning in June 1970. Despite finding "corruption everywhere", no actions were taken by the government.

Death 
Wilopo died in Jakarta in 1981.

Personal life 
During his time in Jakarta, he met Sumikalimah, the younger sister of Abdul Rasyid's mother. Sumikalimah is a teacher at an elementary school. Wilopo began a relationship with Sumikalimah until they got married in October 1917.

Legacy

Historical assessment 
Herbert Feith, an Australian scholar on Indonesian politics, notes that Wilopo was widely considered fair-minded and sympathetic to the plight of the working classes, working carefully towards his goals. As he did not prioritize party loyalty, he was known as being able to cooperate with anyone.

References

Footnotes

Bibliography 

  
  
 
  
 

People from Purworejo Regency
Javanese people
Prime Ministers of Indonesia
1909 births
1981 deaths
Indonesian National Party politicians
Members of the Constitutional Assembly of Indonesia
Foreign ministers of Indonesia